The 2022–23 season is FC Urartu's twenty-second consecutive season in the Armenian Premier League.

Season events
On 28 June, Urartu announced the signing of Maksim Mayrovich on a free transfer from Noah.

On 4 July, Urartu announced the signing of Leon Sabua from Krasnodar.

On 22 July, Urartu announced the signings of Zhirayr Margaryan from Veres Rivne and Everson from Goiás. The following day, 23 July, Yevgeni Nazarov joined from Bohemians 1905.

On 3 August, Urartu announced the signing of Aleksandr Melikhov from Akhmat Grozny.

On 11 August, Urartu announced the signing of Marcos Júnior from Volta Redonda.

On 26 August, Urartu announced the loan signing of Buiu from Noroeste.

On 1 September, Yevgeni Nazarov left Urartu by mutual consent having played twice for the club.

On 9 September, Urartu announced the signing of David Khurtsidze from Alashkert.

On 13 December, Everson left Urartu by mutual consent having played five times for the club.

On 20 December, Edgar Grigoryan left Urartu by mutual consent having played five times for the club.

On the 29 December, Erik Vardanyan announced his retirement from football due to a knee injury, and that he would become a football scout for Urartu.

On 17 January, Urartu announced the signing of Aras Özbiliz.

On 25 January, Urartu announced the signing of Rafael Carioca from América de Natal.

On 27 January, Urartu announced the signing of free-agent Yaya Sanogo.

On 4 February, Urartu announced the signing of Ivan Zotko from Kryvbas Kryvyi Rih.

On 11 February, Urartu announced the signing of Dramane Salou who'd previously played for Noah.

On 21 February, Temur Dzhikiya joined Urartu on loan from Volga Ulyanovsk.

Squad

Transfers

In

Loans in

Loans out

Released

Friendlies

Competitions

Overall record

Premier League

Results summary

Results by round

Results

Table

Armenian Cup

Statistics

Appearances and goals

|-
|colspan="16"|Players away on loan:

|-
|colspan="16"|Players who left Urartu during the season:

|}

Goal scorers

Clean sheets

Disciplinary record

References

FC Urartu seasons
Urartu